The Saint Leonard–Van Buren Bridge is an international bridge, which connects the communities of St. Leonard, New Brunswick in Canada and Van Buren, Maine in the United States, across the Saint John River.

Transport Canada estimated the bridge's traffic at 272,425 vehicles annually in 2006.

Border crossing

The Van Buren - St. Leonard Border Crossing is located at the Saint Leonard – Van Buren Bridge on the Canada–United States border.  During the 19th century, hand-pulled ferry service connected these two cities.  In 2008, a flood of the Saint John River severely damaged the Van Buren border station.

History
The bridge was first constructed in 1911, replacing a cable ferry, and opened in 1912. It was designed and construction overseen by Elmer E. Greenwood, who was the principal bridge designer for the state of Maine from the period 1904–1916. The current structure replaced the original bridge in 1972.

See also
 List of crossings of the Saint John River

References

External links
 Transport Canada
  Who's Who in Engineering: 1922, edited by John W. Leonard, Brooklyn, NY. Page 525, Elmer E. Greenwood
 Flood of April and May 2008 in Northern Maine

Road bridges in New Brunswick
Canada–United States bridges
Bridges completed in 1911
Bridges completed in 1972
Bridges over the Saint John River (Bay of Fundy)
Road bridges in Maine
International bridges in Maine
1911 establishments in Canada
1911 establishments in Maine
Van Buren, Maine
Transportation buildings and structures in Aroostook County, Maine
Buildings and structures in Madawaska County, New Brunswick